Kristina Bates (born 9 January 1996) is an Australian field hockey player.

Bates was born in North Fitzroy, Victoria, and made her senior international debut during the 2017 Hawke's Bay Cup in New Zealand. She was part of the Hockeyroos team at the World Cup in London 2018.

Bates was part of the Australian women's junior national team 'The Jillaroos' that won bronze at the 2016 Hockey Junior World Cup in Chile.

Bates currently studies a Bachelor of Laws at Deakin University. She is also the 2021 and 2022 Premier League captain of Camberwell Hockey Club.

References

External links
 
 
 

1996 births
Living people
Australian female field hockey players
Sportswomen from Victoria (Australia)
Female field hockey forwards
Field hockey players from Melbourne
21st-century Australian women